is a Japanese anime mecha designer, storyboard artist, and director, known for cult classics M.D. Geist, Genocyber,  and Gunbuster. He directed Burst Angel and the second through fourth seasons of Ikki Tousen anime series.

Filmography

References

External links
 
 

1962 births
Living people
Anime character designers
Anime directors
Mechanical designers (mecha)
People from Aichi Prefecture